Army general, was the highest peacetime general officer rank in the so-called armed organs of the GDR, that is, the  Ministry of National Defence,  the Stasi, and the Ministry of the Interior. It is comparable to the four-star rank in many NATO armed forces. It was aligned with Soviet military doctrine and other armed forces of the Warsaw Pact.
 
The rank was reserved to minister level exclusively. Consequently, in the National People's Army service branches, Landstreitkräfte, Luftstreitkräfte/Luftverteidigung, Border troops, and Volksmarine there was no equivalent. However, if a Navy flag officer was designated or appointed Minister of National Defence he would be promoted to Flottenadmiral. When the armed organs of the GDR were disbanded in October 1990, the rank was abolished.

Rankholders
East German officers who achieved the rank were:

Insignia

Army general in other countries
The four-star rank OF-9 was widely used in other armed forces of socialist countries, such as:
Bulgaria: Армейски генерал (Armeyski general)
Czechoslovakia: Armádní generál
Hungary: Hadseregtábornok
Poland: Generał armii
Romania: General de armată
Soviet Union: Генерал армии (General armii)
Yugoslavia: Генерал армије

See also
 General (Germany)
 Military ranks of East Germany
 Corps colours (NPA)

References

Bibliography 
 

Military ranks of Germany
Military of East Germany
1956 establishments in East Germany
1990 disestablishments in East Germany